The TechHaus Volantis is an American electric-powered hover vehicle commissioned by pop star Lady Gaga as a "flying dress" in support of her 2013 album Artpop.

Design and development
Volantis is a remote-piloted hover vehicle capable of carrying a single passenger. It was designed by the UK based agency Studio XO in consultation with drone designer and pilot Gus Calderon and was constructed in the US by TechHaus, the technology branch of Lady Gaga's creative team, the Haus of Gaga. Begun in 2011, it took two years to complete.

The design is essentially a scaled-up drone. Six lifting rotor units are mounted on booms in a hexagonal formation radiating from a central hub, giving the device the ability to hover three feet above the ground.

A triangular vertical truss made of titanium extends down from the hub, with a circular landing platform at the bottom. A single passenger stands on the platform and is secured to the truss by a safety harness. The harness is in turn covered by a white moulded carbon fiber "dress".

Each rotor unit comprises two concentric and contra-rotating rotors made from carbon fiber composite, driven by electric motors and mounted within a common duct. Power is provided by onboard batteries with a capacity of approximately 250 Ah. The battery system is located at the top of the central column, which helps to minimize the length and weight of power cabling. A remote pilot operates the craft via radio control.

The passenger must wear a safety helmet and has no flight controls.

Operational history
At her ArtRave event in 2013, inside a building at the Brooklyn Navy Yard, Gaga hosted a press conference at which she introduced Volantis as "the world's first flying dress". It has been described by Entertainment Weekly as a "hover dress". At the event, Volantis took off and hovered a few feet (a meter or so) above the stage. It was flown forward a short distance, then brought back and landed.

Gaga had promoted the dress by tweeting earlier in the day, "At 6pm EST today we will beta test VOLANTIS with the world. We invite you into our creative process during her initial stages of lift off." She quipped that the dress was "maybe a small step for Volantis... but a big-time step" for her.

In May 2017 Volantis was scheduled to be displayed in the "Drones: Is the Sky the Limit?" exhibition at the Intrepid Sea, Air & Space Museum, New York.

Specifications

See also

 2013 in aviation
 Helicopter
 Hiller VZ-1 Pawnee flying platform
 Personal air vehicle
 Volantor (Moller M200)
 List of individual dresses

References

Notes

Bibliography
 
 

Individual dresses
Lady Gaga
Personal air vehicles
White dresses